Sydney Kolodziej (born August 18, 1993) is an American pair skater. Representing Canada with Maxime Deschamps, she has competed at the Four Continents Championships, placing 9th in 2018, and on the Grand Prix series, at the 2017 Skate Canada International.

Career

Early years 
Kolodziej began learning to skate in 2000. In 2005, she competed in the juvenile girls group at the Upper Great Lakes Regionals in Duluth, Minnesota and placed 1st overall. She furthered at the regionals in the ladies’ category, winning bronze and finished 5th at Midwestern Sectionals in the 2007–2008 and 2008–2009 seasons. She was a member of the Broadmoor Skating Club.

Partnership with Deschamps 
In 2016, Kolodziej teamed up with Maxime Deschamps to compete in pair skating for Canada. The pair finished 6th at the 2017 Canadian Championships, having ranked 6th in the short program and 4th in the free skate.

Coached by Richard Gauthier, Bruno Marcotte, and Sylvie Fullum in Saint-Leonard, Quebec, Kolodziej/Deschamps made their international debut as a pair in September, at the 2017 CS U.S. Classic, where they placed 7th. Skate Canada also selected the pair to compete at a Grand Prix event, the 2017 Skate Canada International. They finished 8th at their Grand Prix assignment and then 7th at the 2018 Canadian Championships. They were named in Canada's team to the 2018 Four Continents Championships in Taipei and finished 9th after placing 8th in the short program and 9th in the free skate.

Programs 
With Deschamps

Competitive highlights 
GP: Grand Prix; CS: Challenger Series

Pairs with Deschamps

Ladies' singles

References

External links
 

1993 births
American expatriate sportspeople in Canada
American female pair skaters
Canadian female pair skaters
Living people
People from Elk Grove Village, Illinois
Sportspeople from Illinois
Figure skaters from Montreal